Welbeck Street car park was an architecturally notable car park built in the Brutalist style that was found in Marylebone, just north of Oxford Street, in the City of Westminster, London. The entrance was on the east side in Welbeck Street and it also borderered Henrietta Place in the south and Marylebone Lane in the west.

Construction
The car park, designed by Michael Blampied and Partners, was completed in 1970 for the use of the nearby Debenhams store using a design of tessellated concrete polygons.

Sale and demolition
In 2016, the site was sold to Shiva Hotels who were given permission to demolish the car park in 2017.  Despite opposition from architects and The Twentieth Century Society, Historic England decided not to register the car park as a listed building and demolition of the structure began in October 2019.

References

External links 

Buildings and structures completed in 1970
Buildings and structures in the City of Westminster
Parking facilities in the United Kingdom
Welbeck Street
Buildings and structures demolished in 2019